Donald Franklin Stewart (22 May 1929 – 17 March 1996) was an American historian and curator who was director of the Five Fathom Lightship Museum in West Ocean City, Maryland and the USS Constellation Museum in Baltimore, Maryland. He was the Curator of the USS Torsk Submarine (Inner Harbor Baltimore). He was a National Board Member of Operation Sail 1976 and the Director of Op Sail 1976 in Baltimore.  He was a founder of the American College of Heraldry and Arms.  He was born in Baltimore and died in Herndon, Virginia.

References
"When The Ships' Cannon Roared Off Old Worcester Coast," The Maryland Beachcomber, 8/24/79, reprinted at Fassitt Information: Accomac County VA and Worcester County MD website.
 Coat of arms grant documents, Lyndon Baines Johnson Presidential Library and Museum.

1929 births
1996 deaths
American heraldists
American curators
20th-century American historians
American male non-fiction writers
West Ocean City, Maryland
People from Baltimore
People from Herndon, Virginia
Historians from Virginia
Historians from Maryland
20th-century American male writers